Miller County is a county located in the southwestern corner of the U.S. state of Arkansas. As of the 2020 census, the population was 42,600. The county seat is Texarkana.

Miller County is part of the Texarkana, TX-AR, Metropolitan Statistical Area.

When first formed, Miller County was Arkansas's sixth county, established on April 1, 1820, and named for James Miller, the first governor of the Arkansas Territory.  Additionally, Miller County was the first of the state's counties to be formed upon the creation of the Arkansas Territory.  The first five — Arkansas, Lawrence, Clark, Hempstead and Pulaski — were formed during Arkansas's days as part of the Missouri Territory. This county was abolished in 1838.

During the Reconstruction era, it was organized again on December 22, 1874, from a portion of neighboring Lafayette County.

History

When created in 1820, Miller County included most of the current Miller County, as well as several present-day Texas counties. In 1831 the county seat was located what is the current day Clarksville, Texas.

When Arkansas achieved statehood the same year as Texas declared itself an independent republic in 1836, a dispute arose over their common border, with the area in Miller County having representation in both the Arkansas legislature and the Texas congress.  In 1837 and 1838, Texas organized Red River and Fannin counties, respectively, in the area.  Arkansas attempted to counter by making it a misdemeanor for Miller County residents to hold office in Texas, and then by establishing a county court in Fannin.  The attempts were ultimately unsuccessful. In 1845 Texas agreed to annexation by the United States, settling the boundary between Texas and Arkansas.  As much of Miller County was lost to Texas, the county was dissolved, with the remaining territory returning to Lafayette County.

The modern Miller County was re-created in 1874 from the parts of Lafayette County lying west and south of the Red River.

Geography

Miller County is located in the southwest corner of Arkansas in the Piney Woods, a temperate coniferous forest. The forests of pine trees initially formed a logging and silviculture industry, though many fields have been cleared from the forest to grow rice, soybeans, corn, and vegetables. The county is also within the Ark-La-Tex region, sharing a tripoint with Texas and Louisiana. The Ark-La-Tex is an economic region anchored by Shreveport, Louisiana, Tyler, Texas, Longview, Texas, and Texarkana. The Red River serves as the northern and eastern boundary of the county, though the watercourse has shifted since the county's reestablishment in 1874. The original Red River continues to serve as the county line between Little River, Hempstead, and Lafayette counties in Arkansas.

Miller County is surrounded by three Arkansas counties: Little River County to the north, Hempstead County to the northeast, Lafayette County to the east; two Louisiana parishes: Bossier Parish to the southeast and Caddo Parish, to the south; and two Texas counties to the west: Cass and Bowie.

Ecology

Miller County is within the South Central Plains Level III ecoregion designated by the Environmental Protection Agency. Within the region, the county contains parts of four different Level IV ecoregions. Throughout the South Central Plains, forests are mostly swamp - southern floodplain forest, unlike the oak–hickory–pine forest of higher, better drained forests in adjacent eco-regions.

Along the north and eastern county boundary, the Red River Bottomlands follows the Red River. This eco-region contains floodplains, low terraces, oxbow lakes, meander scars, backswamps, natural levees, and the meandering Red River. Natural vegetation is southern floodplain forest unlike the oak–hickory– pine forest of higher, better drained compared to adjacent forests. However, the region has widely been cleared and drained for agriculture. The Red River is almost continuously turbid; suspended sediment concentrations are usually much higher than in the Saline River or Ouachita River due to land cover, land use, and upstream lithology differences.

South of Texarkana, the Floodplains and Low Terraces eco-region follows the Sulphur River. It contains frequently flooded forested wetlands, natural levees, swales, oxbow lakes, and meander scars. Longitudinal channel gradients are low and are less than in the Ouachita Mountains. North of the low terraces, a small strip of Pleistocene Fluvial Terraces ecoregion contains level, poorly-drained, periodically wet soils underlain by Pleistocene unconsolidated terrace deposits. Loblolly pine and oaks are common and are adapted to the prevailing hydroxeric regime; pastureland and hayland are less extensive. A vertical sequence of terraces occurs. The lowest terrace is nearly flat, clayey, and has extensive hardwood wetlands. Higher terraces become progressively older and more dissected; they are dominated by pine flatwoods, pine savanna, or prairie; flatwood wetlands are less extensive than on the lowest terrace. The mid-level terrace is veneered with windblown silt deposits (loess). Streams tend to be mildly acidic and stained by organic matter. They have more suspended solids, greater turbidity, and higher hardness values than the Tertiary Uplands.

Hydrology

Miller County is within the Red River watershed. The historic channel of the Red River defines the northern and eastern boundary of Miller County. The Sulphur River, McKinney Bayou, and Bois D'Arc Creek are also important water courses in the county; all tributary to the Red River. Swamps and bayous along the Sulphur River drain much of the western part of Miller County. A levee in the eastern part of Miller County delineates the border between the McKinney Bayou watershed, with everything east of the levee within the Red River floodplain. Areas within the levee are frequently subject to inundation by the Red, including a town evacuation of Garland City in 2015.

Protected areas
Miller County contains two protected areas: the Sandhills Natural Area owned by the Arkansas Natural Heritage Commission (ANHC), and the Sulphur River Wildlife Management Areas (WMA), owned by the Arkansas Game and Fish Commission (AGFC). The Sandhills Natural Area preserves  of undisturbed sandhill vegetation along rolling hills and sandy soils. It is a home to at least 40 rare species of plants, the most of any ANHC Natural Area. The Sulphur River WMA preserves  of bottomland hardwood forest, cypress breaks, oxbow lakes, and bayous along the Red River Valley. Established in the 1950s, the area is open to birding, camping, hunting, fishing, and hiking. Within the WMA,  is maintained as the Henry Moore Waterfowl Rest Area.

Demographics

2020 Census

As of the 2020 United States census, there were 42,600 people, 16,426 households, and 11,108 families residing in the county.

2010 Census

As of the 2010 census, there were 43,462 people, 17,219 households, and 11,685 families residing in the county. The population density was 68 people per square mile (26/km2).  There were 19,281 housing units at an average density of 30 per square mile (12/km2). The racial makeup of the county was 71.6% White, 24.5% Black or African American, 0.7% Native American, 0.5% Asian, 0.04% Pacific Islander, 1.0% from other races, and 1.7% from two or more races. 2.4% of the population were Hispanic or Latino of any race.

There were 11,685 households, out of which 34.00% had children under the age of 18 living with them, 45.9% were married couples living together, 17.0% had a female householder with no husband present, and 32.1% were non-families. 27.4% of all households were made up of individuals, and 9.8% had someone living alone who was 65 years of age or older. The average household size was 2.44 and the average family size was 2.95.

In the county, the population was spread out, with 24.3% under the age of 18, 9.1% from 18 to 24, 26.6% from 25 to 44, 26.1% from 45 to 64, and 13.8% who were 65 years of age or older. The median age was 37.2 years. For every 100 females there were 97.0 males. For every 100 females age 18 and over, there were 93.6 males.

The median income for a household in the county was $40,307, and the median income for a family was $47,960. Males had a median income of $41,556 versus $30,417 for females. The per capita income for the county was $19,654. About 14.1% of families and 18.1% of the population were below the poverty line, including 29.1% of those under age 18 and 12.9% of those age 65 or over.

2000 Census

As of the 2000 census, there were 40,443 people, 15,637 households, and 11,086 families residing in the county.  The population density was 65 people per square mile (25/km2).  There were 17,727 housing units at an average density of 28 per square mile (11/km2).  The racial makeup of the county was 74.02% White, 22.99% Black or African American, 0.63% Native American, 0.37% Asian, 0.02% Pacific Islander, 0.54% from other races, and 1.43% from two or more races. 1.58% of the population were Hispanic or Latino of any race.

There were 15,637 households, out of which 34.00% had children under the age of 18 living with them, 50.90% were married couples living together, 16.00% had a female householder with no husband present, and 29.10% were non-families. 25.60% of all households were made up of individuals, and 10.70% had someone living alone who was 65 years of age or older.  The average household size was 2.52 and the average family size was 3.02.

In the county, the population was spread out, with 26.50% under the age of 18, 9.70% from 18 to 24, 28.60% from 25 to 44, 22.10% from 45 to 64, and 13.10% who were 65 years of age or older.  The median age was 35 years. For every 100 females there were 95.00 males.  For every 100 females age 18 and over, there were 90.10 males.

The median income for a household in the county was $30,951, and the median income for a family was $36,665. Males had a median income of $33,080 versus $21,376 for females. The per capita income for the county was $16,444.  About 15.40% of families and 19.30% of the population were below the poverty line, including 27.90% of those under age 18 and 16.50% of those age 65 or over.

Human resources

Education

Educational attainment in Miller County is typical for a rural Arkansas county, with a 2016 study finding 85.5% of Miller County residents over age 25 held a high school degree or higher, in line with Arkansas and national averages of 85.2% and 87.0%, respectively. Miller County's proportion of population holding a bachelor's degree or higher is 14.5%, significantly below the state average of 21.5% and national average of 30.3%.

Primary and secondary education

Public school districts serving sections of Miller County:
 Fouke School District
 Genoa Central School District
 Lafayette County School District
 Texarkana Arkansas School District (TASD)

Three of those districts are based in Miller County; TASD is the largest school district in Miller County, with the Fouke District serving approximately the southern half of the county, and the Genoa District serving a small area around Genoa between the two larger districts. Successful completion of the curriculum of these schools leads to graduation from Arkansas High School, Fouke High School, or Genoa Central High School respectively. All three high schools offer Advanced Placement (AP) courses and are accredited by the Arkansas Department of Education (ADE).  TASD also offers graduation from the Washington Academy Charter School, an alternative public charter school, and Texarkana Area Vocational Center. Arkansas HS offers concurrent credit agreements with nearby University of Arkansas Community College at Hope (UACCH) Texarkana Campus, and is the only school in the county accredited by AdvancED.

Students in the northeast part of Miller County around Garland outside the three Miller County-based districts are within the Lafayette County School District.

Higher education
Miller County contains one institution of higher education, the Texarkana campus of University of Arkansas Community College at Hope, a public community college based in Hope, Arkansas. Texarkana, Texas contains Texas A&M University–Texarkana, a public four-year university with a high percentage of students from Arkansas, and Texarkana College, a community college. Other higher education institutions in the region include Cossatot Community College in De Queen, Arkansas, Southern Arkansas University in Magnolia, and several institutions in the vicinity of Shreveport, Louisiana.

Libraries
The Texarkana Public Library is located at 600 West 3rd Street. TPL offers books, e-books, media, reference, youth, business and genealogy services. In Fouke, the Ann & Dewey Fowler Community Library is located at 305 N Snell Street in a restored Victorian house.

Public health

Miller County's above-average poverty rate indicates a high Medicaid eligibility rate. As of 2012, 32.4% of Miller County was eligible for Medicaid, with 61.7% of children under 19 eligible for ARKids First, a program by the Arkansas Department of Human Services that combines children's Medicaid (ARKids A) and other programs for families with higher incomes (ARKids B). The county's population is significantly above healthy weight, with 54.0% of adults and 38.0% of children/adolescents ranking as overweight or obese, compared to the state averages of 67.1% and 39.3%, respectively. These rates are significantly above national averages of 62.9% and 30.3%, respectively.

The Christus St. Michael Health System and Wadley Regional Medical Center in Texarkana are community hospitals offering acute inpatient care, emergency care, surgery, rehabilitation, therapy, and senior care services. The facilities are both rated Level 3 Trauma Centers by the Arkansas Department of Health. The University of Arkansas for Medical Sciences (UAMS) offers a family medicine residency program at the UAMS Southwest Area Health Education Center in Texarkana. CHI St. Vincent Hot Springs in Hot Springs is a referral hospital in the region, focusing on neurosurgery, cancer treatment, cardiovascular care, and orthopaedics.

The nearest Level 1 Trauma Center is University Health in Shreveport.

Public safety

The Miller County Sheriff's Office is the primary law enforcement agency in the county. The agency is led by the Miller County Sheriff, an official elected by countywide vote every four years.

The county is under the jurisdiction of the 37th District Court, a state district court. State district courts in Arkansas are courts of original jurisdiction for criminal, civil (up to $25,000), small claims, and traffic matters. State district courts are presided over by a full-time District Judge elected to a four-year term by a districtwide election. The judge presides over both the Texarkana Department at 100 North State Line Avenue in Texarkana and the Miller County Department at the Miller County Correctional Facility at 2300 East Street.

Superseding district court jurisdiction is the 8th Judicial Circuit Court South, which covers Miller and Lafayette counties. The 8th Circuit South contains three circuit judges, elected to six-year terms circuitwide. Circuit court is held at the Miller County Courthouse at 400 Laurel Street in Texarkana.

Government

The county government is a constitutional body granted specific powers by the Constitution of Arkansas and the Arkansas Code. The quorum court is the legislative branch of the county government and controls all spending and revenue collection. Representatives are called justices of the peace and are elected from county districts every even-numbered year. The number of districts in a county vary from nine to fifteen, and district boundaries are drawn by the county election commission. The Miller County Quorum Court has eleven members. Presiding over quorum court meetings is the county judge, who serves as the chief operating officer of the county. The county judge is elected at-large and does not vote in quorum court business, although capable of vetoing quorum court decisions.

Politics
Since the mid-20th century, Miller County has transitioned from reliably Democratic to steady Republican in national, state and local elections. Miller County was part of the Solid South, a period of Democratic hegemony which began after Reconstruction following the Civil War. This resulted essentially in a one-party system, in which a candidate's victory in Democratic primary elections was tantamount to election to the office itself. The Solid South started to dissolve following the Civil Rights Act in 1964, which is when Miller County's streak of supporting Democratic candidates ended. The county would support every Republican presidential candidate after 1964, with exceptions for fellow Southerners: Alabama Governor George Wallace in 1968, Georgia Governor Jimmy Carter in 1976, and fellow Arkansan Bill Clinton in 1992 and 1996. Republican strength has been growing rapidly in Miller County, supporting George Bush with 53 and 58 percent of the vote, supporting Barack Obama’s opponents with 66 and 69 percent of the vote, and supporting Donald Trump with 70.2 and 72.1 percent of the vote.

In Congress, Arkansas has been represented by two Republican senators (John Boozman and Tom Cotton) since January 3, 2015, ending a long history of Democratic hegemony. In the House of Representatives, Miller County is within the Arkansas 4th district, which contains Southwest Arkansas, the Arkansas River Valley, and a few Ozark counties. The Arkansas 4th has been represented by Bruce Westerman since 2014.

In the Arkansas Senate, Miller County is within the 11th District. The district also contains Little River and Lafayette counties, and parts of Hempstead and Sevier counties. The 11th has been represented by Jimmy Hickey Jr. (R) of Texarkana since 2013. In the Arkansas House of Representatives, Miller County contains two Districts. The 1st District is almost coterminal with Texarkana, with the rest of the county within the 2nd District. The 2nd District also covers most of Lafayette County and parts of Columbia County, including Magnolia. The Texarkana district has been represented by Carol Dalby (R) since 2016, with the 2nd District represented by Lane Jean (R) since 2012.

Miller County has produced some successful politicians, including three longtime members of the U.S. House of Representatives: Mike Ross represented the Arkansas 4th from 2001 to 2013, Walter E. Rogers represented the Texas's 18th from 1951 to 1967, and Max Sandlin represented the Texas 1st from 1997 to 2005. William F. Kirby served as Arkansas Attorney General from 1907 to 1909, Arkansas Supreme Court Associate Justice from 1910 to 1916 and 1926 to 1934, and represented Arkansas in the U.S. Senate from 1916 to 1921.

Taxation

Property tax is assessed by the Miller County Assessor annually based upon the fair market value of the property and determining which tax rate, commonly called a millage in Arkansas, will apply. The rate depends upon the property's location with respect to city limits, school district, and special tax increment financing (TIF) districts. This tax is collected by the Randolph County Collector between the first business day of March of each year through October 15th without penalty. The Miller County Treasurer disburses tax revenues to various government agencies, such as cities, county road departments, fire departments, libraries, and police departments in accordance with the budget set by the quorum court.

Due to Miller County's proximity to Texas, which has no state personal income tax, special taxation exemptions apply to residents with permanent addresses within the city limits of Texarkana. The Arkansas Department of Finance and Administration (DFA) requires taxpayers to submit the Texarkana Employee's Withholding Exemption Certificate with their Arkansas tax return. Taxpayers are exempt from Arkansas income tax, and residents of Texarkana, Texas are exempt from Arkansas income tax from any income earned within the city limits of Texarkana, Arkansas.

Sales and use taxes in Arkansas are voter approved and collected by the DFA.
Arkansas's statewide sales and use tax has been 6.5% since July 1, 2013. Miller County has an additional sales and use tax of 1.25%, which has been in effect since October 1, 2012. Within Miller County, the City of Texarkana has an additional 2.5% sales and use tax since January 1, 2008, and the towns of Fouke and Garland having an additional 1.0% sales and use tax, each since the early 1980s The Arkansas State Treasurer disburses tax revenue to counties/cities in accordance with tax rules.

Communities

City
Texarkana (county seat)

Towns
Fouke
Garland

Unincorporated communities

Artex
Beck
Black Diamond
Boggy
Boyd
Brightstar
Capps City
Clear Lake Junction
Clipper
Doddridge
Dooley
Fairland
Ferguson Crossroads
Fort Lynn
Genoa
Gertrude
Hammons
Hervey
Homan
Index
Jonesville
Kiblah
Lakewood Estates
Mandeville
Mayton
McKinney
Mount Pleasant
Paup
Pleasant Hill
Ravanna
Rocky Mound
Rondo
Smithville
Sylverino

Historical communities

Boggy
Era
Roverts
Spring Bank
Wona

Townships

 Beech (Fouke)
 Cleveland
 Cut Off
 Days Creek
 Garland (Texarkana)
 Homan
 Red River (Garland)
 Sulphur

Infrastructure

Major highways

 Interstate 30
 Interstate 49
 U.S. Highway 59
 U.S. Highway 67
 U.S. Highway 71
 U.S. Highway 82
 Highway 108
 Highway 134
 Highway 160
 Highway 196
 Highway 237
 Highway 245
 Highway 296
 Highway 549

Utilities

The Arkansas Department of Health (ADH) is responsible for the regulation and oversight of public water systems throughout the state. Miller County contains six community water systems: Texarkana Water Utilities (TWU), Fouke Waterworks, Miller County Public Water Authority (PWA), Garland Waterworks, Eastern Cass Water Supply Corporation, and Shady Acres Mobile Home Park. TWU, a joint department between the two Texarkana municipalities, provides drinking water and fire flows on both sides of the state line, including several partner cities in Texas. Its source waters are Lake Millwood in Arkansas and Lake Wright Patman in Texas. Miller County PWA purchases water from TWU, and has the same executive director as of February 2018. The remaining systems have retail populations served under 1,000, and are groundwater systems.

See also
 List of lakes in Miller County, Arkansas
 National Register of Historic Places listings in Miller County, Arkansas

Notes

References

External links

 
1874 establishments in Arkansas
Populated places established in 1874